Jacob Hellner (born 19 March 1961) is a Swedish music producer who has produced bands like Rammstein, Apocalyptica, and Clawfinger. He is best known for producing every Rammstein album from Herzeleid to Rammstein: Paris, as well as assisting in the production of albums from Rammstein members' side projects Emigrate and Lindemann.

Production credits 

 Clawfinger - Deaf Dumb Blind (1993)
 Clawfinger - Use Your Brain (1995)
 Rammstein - Herzeleid (1995)
 Fleshquartet - Fire Fire (1996)
 Rammstein - Sehnsucht (1997)
 Rammstein - Live aus Berlin (1999)
 Rammstein - Mutter (2001)
 Clawfinger - A Whole Lot of Nothing (2001)
 Monster - Rockers Delight (2002)
 Covenant - Northern Light (2002)
 Clawfinger - Zeros & Heroes (2003)
 Felix da Housecat - A Bugged Out Mix (2003)
 Rammstein - Reise, Reise (2004)
 Rammstein - Rosenrot (2005)
 Rammstein - Völkerball (2006)
 Apocalyptica - Worlds Collide (2007)
 Covenant - In Transit (2007)
 Emigrate - Emigrate (2007)
 Backyard Babies - Backyard Babies (2008)
 Rammstein - Liebe ist für alle da (2009)
 Delain - We Are the Others (2012)
 Lindemann - Skills in Pills (2015)
 Backyard Babies - Four by Four (2015)
 Entombed A.D. - Dead Dawn (2016)
 Rammstein - Paris (2017)
 Entombed A.D. - Bowels of Earth (2019)

References

External links 
 Jacob Hellner Produzent Rammstein - Intro in German, interview in English 
 Jacob Hellner Interview - Intro in German, interview in English

Swedish record producers
Living people
1961 births